Stephen M. Jones Building is a historic multi-family dwelling located at Washington, Franklin County, Missouri. It was built in 1883, and is a -story, six bay, brick building with a side-facing flattened gable roof covered.  It features paired brick chimneys in the gabled ends, segmental arched windows, and a brick denticulated cornice.

It was listed on the National Register of Historic Places in 2000.

References

Residential buildings on the National Register of Historic Places in Missouri
Residential buildings completed in 1883
Buildings and structures in Franklin County, Missouri
National Register of Historic Places in Franklin County, Missouri